Navaratne Bandara Raja Sumanapala (born 1936 – died 2003 as රාජා සුමනපාල) [Sinhala]), popularly known as Raja Sumanapala, was an actor in Sri Lankan cinema, stage drama and television.

Personal life
He was born on 1936 in Pelmadulla. He completed education from Gankanda Central College, Pelmadulla.

He was married to popular actress Rathna Sumanapala. The couple has two daughters - Waruni, Manjula - and two sons - Prabash and Mahesh.

Grandchildrens - Dushantha Deshan Samayamanthri , Dulhan Tanishka Sumanapala , Bisandi Laknara Sumanapala , Dulan Hansaja Sumanapala , Dinali Shenara Sumanapala , Bihandu Yethmin perera , Vidusha Sumanapala

Acting career
He worked in Pelmadulla Art Forum in music department where he met future wife Rathna.

He has acted in several popular television serials in the early periods. His character as "Ali James" in Kopi Kade was highly popularized.

Selected television serials

 Hathe Wasama 
 Hiru Sandu Hamuwe 
 Hiruta Muwawen 
 Laa Hiru Dahasak 
 Lokanthaya
 Wetath Niyarath 
 Yashorawaya

Awards
 Sumathi Merit Award at Sumathi Awards 2000 — Hathe Wasama 
 Sumathi Merit Award at Sumathi Awards  — Golu muhude kunatuwak.

Filmography
Sumanapala started his film career with 1977 film Pembara Madhu directed by Sugathapala Senarath Yapa. Some of his popular cinema acting came through Mangala Thegga, Wadula, Palama Yata, Gini Avi Saha Gini Keli and his final film Parliament Jokes''.

References

External links
 කලා ලොවේ තරු ජෝඩු - 3
 Chat with Rathna Sumanapala
 යළි හමු නොවන පුංචි තිරයේ ආදරණීය තාත්තලා
 ඒ කාලෙ බලපු මේ ටෙලි නාට්‍ය හත ඔයාට මතකද?

Sri Lankan male film actors
Sinhalese male actors
1936 births
2003 deaths